The weka is a species of New Zealand bird.

Weka may also refer to:

 Weka (machine learning), a suite of machine learning software written at the University of Waikato
 Weka, an unofficial unit prefix
 WEKA-LD, a low-power television station (channel 26, virtual 41) licensed to serve Canton, Ohio, United States